Ole Petter Wie (born 1966) is a Norwegian businessperson.

He was hired as CEO of Norway's largest brewery Ringnes in 2009. Before this he worked in The Coca-Cola Company from 1992 to 2000, Dayrates from 2000 to 2003 (as CEO) and McKinsey & Company from 2003 to 2005. He was then vice president at the Nestlé Global Headquarter from 2005 to 2008 and sales director in Ringnes from 2008 to 2009.

References

1966 births
Living people
Norwegian businesspeople
Date of birth missing (living people)